Miguel Benavides (10 September 1939 – 14 July 2008) was a Cuban actor. He appeared in more than twenty films between 1964 and 2003. He won the award for Best Actor at the 9th Moscow International Film Festival for his role in The Other Francisco.

Filmography

References

External links

1939 births
2008 deaths
Cuban male film actors
20th-century Cuban male actors
21st-century Cuban male actors